Astorga Fútbol Sala was a futsal club based in Astorga, Castile and León.

The team played on pavilion Felipe Miñambres with capacity of 3,000 seats.

Sponsors
Dulma Astorga – Dulma, sweets and desserts. – 1989–90, 1998–99, 1999–00 and 2000–01.
Industriales de Astorga – 1991–92
Ediciones Lara Astorga – 1992–93
Hojaldres Alonso Astorga – 1993–94, 1994–95
M.A. Astorga – 1995–96

History
The club was founded in 1977. The club was twice semifinalist of Copa de España. At end of 2000–01 season, due to the limitations economic, the seat of Astorga FS was sold to Ruta Leonesa FS.

Season to season

12 seasons in División de Honor

Honours
Copa de España: 0
Semifinals: 1989–90, 1994–95 and 1998–99

References

External links
Profile on LNFS.es

Astorga, Spain
Futsal clubs in Castile and León
Futsal clubs established in 1977
Sports clubs disestablished in 2001
1977 establishments in Spain
2001 disestablishments in Spain